Children Act (with its variations) is a stock short title used for the legislation in Malaysia and the United Kingdom that relates to children. The Bill for an Act with this short title will usually have been known as a Children Bill during its passage through Parliament.

Children Acts may be a generic name either for legislation bearing that short title or for all legislation which relates to children.

List

Ireland
The Children Act 2001

Malaysia
The Children and Young Persons Act 1947
The Children and Young Persons (Employment) Act 1966
The Child Act 2001

United Kingdom
The Children Act 1908
The Children Act 1948
The Children Act 1958
The Children Act 1972
The Children Act 1975
The Children Act 1989
The Children (Leaving Care) Act 2000
The Children Act 2004
The Children and Adoption Act 2006

Northern Ireland
The Children (Leaving Care) Act (Northern Ireland) 2002

Scotland
The Children (Scotland) Act 1995
The Children (Scotland) Act 2020

See also
The Children Act novel
List of short titles

Lists of legislation by short title